Dalí Museum may refer to:

Dalí Theatre and Museum, in his home town of Figueres, Spain
Salvador Dalí House Museum, Portlligat, Spain
Salvador Dalí Museum, St. Petersburg, Florida, United States
Dalí Universe, London, UK
Espace Dalí, Paris, France
, Berlin, Germany